Lágrimas negras may refer to:

 "Lágrimas negras" (song), a 1929 song composed by the Cuban composer and singer Miguel Matamoros
 Lágrimas Negras (album), a 2003 album by the Cuban pianist Bebo Valdés
 Lágrimas negras (TV series), a Mexican telenovela